Dell Magazines was a company founded by George T. Delacorte Jr. in 1921 as part of his Dell Publishing Co. Dell is today known for its many puzzle magazines, astrology magazines, as well as fiction magazines such as Alfred Hitchcock's Mystery Magazine, Ellery Queen's Mystery Magazine, Asimov's Science Fiction, and Analog Science Fiction and Fact. It was sold in March 1996 by Dell's successor company to Crosstown Publications, with headquarters in Norwalk, Connecticut, under the same ownership as Penny Publications, LLC, which publishes Penny Press puzzle magazines. The name "Dell Magazines" is still used on some of its magazines.

The first puzzle magazine Dell published was Dell Crossword Puzzles, in 1931, and since then it has printed magazines containing word searches, math and logic puzzles, and other diversions.

In 2019, Dell Magazines is changing the name of the "John W. Campbell Award" to the "Astounding Award" after 2019 winner Jeannette Ng openly condemned John W. Campbell's racist and fascist ideas during her award acceptance speech.

Former Dell magazines 
1000 Jokes
Ballyhoo
I Confess
Modern Screen
Louis L'Amour Western Magazine
Zane Grey Western Magazine

See also 
Penny Publications

External links

References 

Magazine publishing companies of the United States
Publishing companies established in 1921